Coranthus polyacanthus is a species of cardinalfish native to the Indian Ocean and the western Pacific Ocean.  This species grows to a length of  TL and is of importance to local commercial fisheries.  This species is the only known member of its genus.

References

Apogonidae
Fish described in 1877